Kian Paul James Williams (born 1 July 2000) is an English footballer who plays for Canadian Premier League club Valour FC.

Early life
Williams played in the Leicester City youth system from the U10 level through to the U21s.

Club career
In August 2018, Leicester City sent him on loan to Barwell in the seventh tier Southern Football League Premier Division Central. In January 2019, he went on loan to Stratford Town also in the seventh tier Southern Football League Premier Division Central.

In August 2019, Williams joined Icelandic club Magni Grenivík in the second tier 1. deild karla.  Three months later, following the season, he returned to England.

In October 2019, he returned to Stratford Town.

In February 2020, he signed with Keflavík ÍF in the Icelandic second tier. He helped them earn promotion to the top tier Úrvalsdeild and signed an extension through 2022. After the 2022 season, he departed the club. Afterwards, he returned to England and was training with Burton Albion.

In December 2022, he signed with Canadian Premier League club Valour FC for the 2023 season. Cavalry FC had also been interested in signing Williams, but he chose to join Valour.

References

External links
 
 
 Kian William Stats
 Kian Williams at Jobs4Football

2000 births
Living people
English footballers
Association football midfielders
Leicester City F.C. players
Barwell F.C. players
Stratford Town F.C. players
Knattspyrnudeild Keflavík players
Valour FC players
Southern Football League players
1. deild karla players
Úrvalsdeild karla (football) players